Croatia competed at the 2008 Summer Paralympics in Beijing. The country's delegation consisted of 25 competitors.

Croatian competitors took part in table tennis, athletics, equestrian, and swimming.

Medalists

Athletics 

Men
Track events

Field events

Women
Field events

Cycling 

Men

Equestrian 

Mixed

Shooting 

Men, mixed

Swimming 

Men

Women

Table tennis 

Men's singles preliminaries (class 6)

Men's singles preliminaries (class 4–5)

See also
2008 Summer Paralympics
Croatia at the Paralympics
Croatia at the 2008 Summer Olympics

References

External links
Beijing 2008 Paralympic Games Official Site
International Paralympic Committee

Nations at the 2008 Summer Paralympics
2008
Paralympics